Canal Exploration Center is a Cuyahoga Valley Scenic Railroad train station in Independence, Ohio, with a street address in Valley View, Ohio. It is located near Hillside Road in the Cuyahoga Valley National Park. The station was constructed by the National Park Service in the early 2000s.

Notable places nearby
Canal Exploration Center

References

Cuyahoga Valley Scenic Railroad stations